Marvellous Efe Odiete (born 6 September 1978) is a Nigerian gospel singer and songwriter.

Early life and education 
Odiete was born on 6 September 1978 in Sapele, Delta State into a Christian family. He was introduced to music in his early years through the influence of his father Bishop John Odiete. He grew up in the church circles and started playing the bass guitar at age 12. He studied political science at the University of Ibadan.

Career 
He was first runner up in MTN Project Fame (Season 5). After a long hiatus he released various singles such as "Blow you a kiss", "You are worthy" and "I am not Alone".

Personal life 
He married Joy Ilibeno on February 14, 2013.

References 

1978 births
Living people
Nigerian gospel singers
Nigerian Christians
Musicians from Delta State
21st-century Nigerian singers
Nigerian evangelicals
21st-century Christians
Performers of Christian music
Gospel music composers